Disa graminifolia is a species of orchid found in the Cape Floristic Region of South Africa.

References

External links

 
 

graminifolia
Endemic orchids of South Africa